Hilal SK is a sports club of Göztepe, Istanbul, Turkey, established during the last days of the Ottoman Empire.

History
Hilal SK was founded by Halit Galip Ezgü in 1912. One of the original founders of the Turkish Football Federation in 1923, the club celebrated its first Centennial Anniversary in 2012.

Honours
Istanbul Football League:
Degree:5th 1922–1923

Matches
14 May 1915, Fenerbahçe SK – Hilal SK: 5–1
18 June 1915, Fenerbahçe SK – Hilal SK: 4–1
20 October 1922, Fenerbahçe SK – Hilal SK: 4–0
26 January 1923, Fenerbahçe SK – Hilal SK: 9–0
1924, Galatasaray S.K. – Hilal SK: 3–1
16 June 1936, Fenerbahçe SK – Hilal SK: 6–1
14 February 1937, Beşiktaş JK – Hilal SK: 8–1
19 February 1939, Güneş SK – Hilal SK: 0–3 Won by decision
24 March 1940, Topkapı SK – Hilal SK: 3–0

See also

List of Turkish Sports Clubs by Foundation Dates

References

 Hilal Spor Kulübü. Türk Futbol Tarihi vol.1. page(24). (June 1992) Türkiye Futbol Federasyonu Yayınları.

Sports clubs established in 1912
Association football clubs established in 1912
Sport in Istanbul
1912 establishments in the Ottoman Empire